Dance Suomi, or simply Dance, is a Finnish televised dance competition with a format based on the American dance show So You Think You Can Dance. As with other shows in the So You Think You Can Dance franchise, the competition places young dancers from a wide variety of stylistic backgrounds in competition, with a combination of judge decisions and at-home-viewer votes deciding who persists in the competition from week to week. The show is hosted by television personality Caro Axel Smith (credited as "Axl" Smith) and has a judge's panel formed by Marco Bjurström and Merja Satulehto, with a third rotating seat for guest judges. The first season's winner, awarded a cash prize and a dance school scholarship opportunity in New York, was Sam Vaherlehto.

Season 1

Open auditions for the first season of the series were held in 2010 in Helsinki,
Tampere, and Oulu. Over 400 dancers applied and auditioned for the show. Of these, the judges panel selected 60 dancers for their boot camp "shortlist". From these 60 competitors the season's Top 16 were selected to compete in the first season's live shows.

Top 16 contestants 

 Henri Sarajärvi
 Ida Holmlund
 Ima Iduozee
 Jenni Jokikokko
 Jere Jääskeläinen
 Joonas Sakki
 Katri Mäkinen
 Laura Allonen
 Markku Haussila†
 Mia-Mari Sinkkonen†
 Pasi Mäkelä
 Pauliina Laaksonen
 Sam Vaherlehto†
 Sebastian Wennström
 Sirja Lepistö
 Taru Miettinen†

†= Top 4 Finalist

Choreographers

Jaakko Toivonen
Nora Mahmoud
Sari Louko
Ranses Charon
Ida Jousmäki
Lasse Hyttinen
Petri Kauppinen
Minna Tervamäki
Peter Pihlström
Mindy Lindblom
Reija Wäre
Katja Koukkula
Jussi Väänänen
Ambra Succi

See also
Dance on television

References

2010 Finnish television series debuts
Finnish television shows
So You Think You Can Dance
Dance competition television shows
Finnish television series based on American television series
Nelonen original programming
Finnish non-fiction television series